Into The Shangri-La was the Chinese version of the popular show Survivor. The show only ran for one season that aired in late 2001 on China Central Television as well as many small local channels.

The show took place in the mountain regions of China and lasted for thirty days. The contestants for that season were divided into two "villages". The "Sun Village", led by Rui Yang from day three to day twenty-three and then by Liu Fuqi from day twenty-four until the end of the competition, had red as its team color. The "Moon village", led by Zhen Wu, had yellow as its team color. Throughout the competition, the two teams competed against one another in a series of challenges while trying to survive as they traveled through many different villages in the mountain ranges they had been stranded in. Unlike other versions of Survivor, there were no tribal councils and no one was voted out or eliminated. On day twenty-three, Rui Yang and another contestant decided to leave the competition as they did not like the way the native villagers that hosted them were being treated. On day thirty, the contestants took part in their final team challenge, which was won by the Sun village.

Despite the ratings being initially good, the show was not brought back for a second season.

Finishing order

External links
 http://news.bbc.co.uk/2/hi/entertainment/1402950.stm (BBC Article on Show)
 http://bj.sina.com.cn/t/20010813/21448.shtml (Article Introducing the program)
 https://web.archive.org/web/20120324204218/http://www.vvhand.com/zz/xgll/xmgg/xgllgai1_3.htm (Days 1-3 summary)
 https://web.archive.org/web/20120324204229/http://www.vvhand.com/zz/xgll/xmgg/xgllgai4_6.htm (Eps 4-6 summary)
 https://web.archive.org/web/20120324204235/http://www.vvhand.com/zz/xgll/xmgg/xgllgai7_9.htm (7-9 summary)
 https://web.archive.org/web/20120324204240/http://www.vvhand.com/zz/xgll/xmgg/xgllgai10_12.htm (10-12 summary)
 https://web.archive.org/web/20120324204326/http://www.vvhand.com/zz/xgll/xmgg/xgllgai13_15.htm (13-15 summary)
 https://web.archive.org/web/20120324204335/http://www.vvhand.com/zz/xgll/xmgg/xgllgai16_18.htm (16-18 summary)
 https://web.archive.org/web/20120324204359/http://www.vvhand.com/zz/xgll/xmgg/xgllgai19_21.htm (19-21 summary)
 https://web.archive.org/web/20120324204417/http://www.vvhand.com/zz/xgll/xmgg/xgllgai22_24.htm (22-24 summary)

Survivor (franchise)
2001 Chinese television series debuts
2001 Chinese television series endings
Chinese reality television series
Mandarin-language television shows
Television shows filmed in China